The New Market Hotel and Store is a building listed on the National Register of Historic Places in New Market, Minnesota.

References

Buildings and structures in Scott County, Minnesota
Commercial buildings completed in 1897
Hotel buildings on the National Register of Historic Places in Minnesota
Commercial buildings on the National Register of Historic Places in Minnesota
National Register of Historic Places in Scott County, Minnesota